Derek Carcary (born 11 July 1986) is a Scottish former footballer who played for Queen's Park, Rangers, Raith Rovers, Dumbarton, Brechin City and Annan Athletic and Clydebank.

Honours
Dumbarton

Scottish Division Three (fourth tier): Winners 2008–09

External links

References

1986 births
Scottish footballers
Queen's Park F.C. players
Rangers F.C. players
Raith Rovers F.C. players
Dumbarton F.C. players
Brechin City F.C. players
Annan Athletic F.C. players
Clydebank F.C. players
Scottish Football League players
Living people
Association football forwards